Jésus Konnsimbal (born 3 March 1992) is a Central African football forward who currently plays for AS Saint-Priest.

Club career

FC ViOn Zlaté Moravce - Vráble
Konnsimbal made his professional Fortuna Liga debut for ViOn Zlaté Moravce - Vráble against Tatran Prešov on 20 August 2016.

References

External links
 Eurofotbal profile
 
 Futbalnet profile

1992 births
Living people
Central African Republic footballers
Central African Republic expatriate footballers
Central African Republic international footballers
Association football forwards
ŠK Senec players
FC VSS Košice players
FC ViOn Zlaté Moravce players
Slovak Super Liga players
2. Liga (Slovakia) players
People from Ouham-Pendé
Expatriate footballers in Slovakia
Central African Republic expatriate sportspeople in Slovakia
Expatriate footballers in France
Central African Republic expatriate sportspeople in France
AS Pélican players